Deep Throat is a CD boxed set by the musical artist Henry Rollins, released on June 10, 1992. It is a compilation of Rollins's first four spoken–word releases.

Track listing
 Peach
 Boy on the Train
 Dehumanized
 Hiya Handsome
 Short Story
 Touch & Go
 New Age Blues
 First Class
 Change
 New York Story
 Joe Cole Phone Sex God
 Getting Home
 Riding the Bus
 Fun With Letterman
 Santa Cruz Pig
 Friction pt.2
 Tough Guys Talk Dirty
 Untitled
 Short Story
 Hack Writer
 Running, Crawling
 Sex ed.
 Blueprints for the Destruction of the Earth
 Mekanik
 Late Night Phone Blues
 Untouchable
 Exhaustion
 Misunderstanding
 I Wish Someone Had Told Me
 Travel Tips
 Adventures of an Asshole
 Kicked in the Ass by Adventure
 Smokin' the Filter
 Hated
 Decoration
 Romance

References

1992 compilation albums
Henry Rollins compilation albums
Quarterstick Records compilation albums